Adele Kibre was an expert in microphotography and a medievalist who participated in the clandestine discovery and filming of European academic documents during World War II at a time when Western libraries were otherwise unable to obtain scientific publications from countries with whom they were at war.

Early life and education
Adele Kibre was born in Philadelphia in 1898, and grew up in Los Angeles. Her family was involved in Hollywood life; her parents designed sets and one sister was married to a silent film star.
  Her sister Pearl Kibre was also a well-known academic in medieval studies. Adele studied at the University of California, Berkeley and taught Latin there after receiving her master's degree. She later earned a PhD at the University of Chicago. Her dissertation was a study of the text of the Carolingian scholar Smaragdus of Saint-Mihiel's Liber in partibus Donati, and was incorporated, after her death, into a critical edition by Bengt Löfstedt.

Documentation research
She obtained a postdoctoral fellowship to the American Academy of Rome after completing her PhD. She lived for most of the 1930s in Europe, supporting herself by doing research for American academics by photographing materials in European libraries. It was at these European libraries that she was exposed to microfilm technology. In 1939 she met microfilm entrepreneur Eugene Power and acted as his interpreter at the Vatican library. She was recommended by Power to work freelance with the Interdepartmental Committee for the Acquisition of Foreign Publications (IDC), a United States agency which had an office in Stockholm. The role of the agency was to obtain and transmit mostly public documents originating in Europe, in particular from those areas under Axis control. Through this agency Kibre is attributed with sending 182 reels of microfilm to the British Ministry of Information. She also continued to make copies and photograph materials for US faculty and for her own studies, and in 1941 is reported to have journeyed from Europe to the United States with 17 pieces of luggage containing research materials.

Publications
Prolegomena to the unpublished text of Smaragdus' commentary on Donatus, De partibus orationis. Thesis, University of Chicago, 1930
"Microphotography in European libraries." Journal of Documentary Reproduction 4, no. 3 (1941): 158–163.

References

People from Philadelphia
People from Los Angeles
University of California, Berkeley alumni
University of California, Berkeley faculty
Date of birth missing
Date of death missing
University of Chicago alumni
1898 births